Baker Hostel is a government hostel located in Kolkata, West Bengal, India. The hostel was founded in 1910 during the rule of the British Raj by Edward Norman Baker, the then Lieutenant Governor of Bengal. The hostel is located at 8 Smith Lane in Taltala. It is for the male students of Maulana Azad College.

History
Due to the unhygienic environment and inadequate housing system around the Taylor hostel built in 1896 for students in Kolkata, they started a movement for the construction of a new hostel. Nawab Abdul Jabbar initiated the movement in 1908. Khan Bahadur Ahsanullah, A. K. Fazlul Huq played a major role in establishing the hostel. As a result, government built this hostel.

Museum
Two rooms of this hostel (no. 23 and 24) were converted into a museum in honor of Sheikh Mujibur Rahman (Bangabandhu), the founding father and the first president of Bangladesh. The museum was inaugurated on 31 July 1998. On 23 February 2011, a bust of Mujib was installed in the hostel.

In 2017, the All Bengal Minority Youth Federation criticized the decision and demanded that the bust of Bangabandhu be removed from the hostel as Islam does not allow the installation of idols in the building. The organization's general secretary Kamruzzaman found this act objectionable because a mosque is located inside the hostel. The organization sent letters to Mamata Banerjee, the chief minister of West Bengal and Sheikh Hasina, the prime minister of Bangladesh, regarding the matter. In March, the month before Sheikh Hasina's visit to India, the central government of India had directed the West Bengal government to take action against the organization and its supporters, who it termed as anti-Hasina extremist groups.

However, Local Government, Rural Development and Cooperatives Minister Md. Tajul Islam visited the museum in March 2019 and found defects in the bust, which was replaced by a new bust on August 3.

Room No. 24 of the museum is known as Bangabandhu Memorial Room. Bangabandhu's bust is located in front of the door of the room. Inside the room are his used bed, table and chair. There is a small library where the books written by Sheikh Mujibur Rahman are arranged. On the table is a photograph of him giving his 7 March Speech. Entry to the museum is limited and it is managed by the hostel authority.

Notable alumni
 Azizul Haque
 Hamidul Huq Choudhury
 Khaleque Nawaz Khan
 Khalilur Rahman
 Sheikh Mujibur Rahman
 Syed Hedayetullah
 Syed Murtaza Ali

References

External links
 Baker Hostel at Maulana Azad College

Halls of residence in Kolkata
Museums in Kolkata
Museums established in 1998
1910 establishments in India
Sheikh Mujibur Rahman